The 1920 Phillips Haymakers football team represented Phillips University during the 1920 college football season. John Maulbetsch coached the team.  Phillips joined the Southwest Conference for the 1920 season and was outscored 97–0 in conference play against Texas A&M (47–0), Texas (27–0), and Arkansas (20–0). The Galveston Daily News noted that Maulbetsch's 1920 team could not "compare with the strong team" he surprised Texas with in 1919. At the end of the 1920 season, Phillips withdrew from the Southwest Conference, and Maulbetsch accepted a new position at Oklahoma A&M.

In December 1919, Ted Kurtz was selected as captain of the 1920 team.

Schedule

References

Phillips
Phillips Haymakers football seasons
Phillips Haymakers football